Paul Charlton may refer to:
Paul K. Charlton, former US attorney for Arizona
Paul Charlton (judge) (1856–1917), former United States District Judge from Puerto Rico
Paul Charlton (rugby league) (born 1941), Great Britain rugby league player
Paul Charlton (technologist), American computer technologist who led the development of QuickTime 2.0 for Windows
Paul Charlton (YouTuber) (born 1970), British YouTuber and Veteran of the Royal Navy